This is a list of well-known automated transit networks suppliers.

List of operational ATN systems
Currently, five advanced transit networks (ATN) systems are operational, and several more are in the planning stage.

 GRT stands for Group Rapid Transit which use larger capacity vehicles.  Morgantown PRT and the ParkShuttle are quasi-PRT system because they lack some PRT features such as 100% on-demand service.

Commissioning pending

List of automated transit networks (ATN) suppliers
The following table summarizes several well-known automated transit networks (ATN) suppliers based on a comprehensive list from 2020.

 Boeing Vertol's successors are not marketing the Morgantown PRT system and are no longer making transit vehicles .
 CabinTaxi is not undergoing further development but a US firm holds rights to the patents and is marketing the system.
 The Alden staRRcar system was the basis of the Morgantown PRT.  However it also developed separate models.
 The Cabtrack test track used battery powered vehicles but the production model was planned to have power supplied by a bus-bar in the guideway
 Vehicles in "dual mode" systems can use the specialized guideway or ordinary roads.
 Spartan Superway is a non-commercial, ongoing research program staffed by multi-disciplinary students organised by the engineering department of San Jose State University.

See also
 Shweeb, a human powered suspended PRT design, which has a rideable prototype track in Rotorua, New Zealand.

References

Private transport